The Best of Chet on the Road — Live is a live album by guitarist Chet Atkins, released in 1980.

Track listing

Side one
 "This String" (Coben) – 3:40
 "Dance With Me" (Johanna Hall - John Hall) – 3:51
 "Blind Willie" (Kalb) – 3:16
 "Stars and Stripes Forever" (John Philip Sousa) – 3:28
 "Medley: Freight Train/Chattanooga Train" (Dadi) – 3:18

Side two
 "Wheels" (Torres - Stephens) – 1:52
 "Blue Angel" (Lima) – 2:07
 "Recuerdos de la Alhambra" (Atkins) – 3:58
 "Something/Lady Madonna" (George Harrison/ Lennon & McCartney) – 1:50
 "When You Wish upon a Star" (Leigh Harline, Ned Washington) – 3:18
 "Bill Cheatham" (Trad. arr. Atkins - Foster) – 2:56

Personnel
Chet Atkins – guitar
Steve Wariner – bass
Marcel Dadi – guitar
Jack Williams – bass
Paul Yandell – guitar
Terry McMillan – harmonica
The Cherry Sisters – voices
Randy Goodrum – string ensemble
Ray Stevens – piano
Tony Migliore – piano
Randy Hauser – drums
Jerry Carrigan – drums
Production notes
Ray Stevens – producer ("Blind Willie")
Bill Harris – engineer
Charlie Tallent – engineer
Herb Burnette – art direction, cover photography
Hope Powell – liner photography

Chart performance

References
Chet Atkins official website discography

Albums produced by Chet Atkins
1980 live albums
Chet Atkins live albums
RCA Victor live albums